L'Aldea-Amposta-Tortosa railway station is the central railway station of L'Aldea, Spain, while it also serves the areas of Amposta and Tortosa. The station is situated on the Valencia−Sant Vicenç de Calders railway and is part of Adif and it accommodates RENFE long-distance and Rodalies de Catalunya medium-distance trains.

References 

Railway stations in Catalonia
Rodalies de Catalunya stations
Railway stations in Spain opened in 1865